Chet Atkins' Gallopin' Guitar is the first studio album released by American guitarist Chet Atkins on the RCA Victor label (see 1953 in music). It was available as a 10-inch vinyl record.

History
Atkins had previously recorded on Bullet Records and also as a sideman with various acts. He was brought to RCA by Steve Sholes in 1947. After playing on a variety of radio shows, Radio manager Si Simon had been promoting Atkins by sending acetates of Chet's live radio performances to various record companies. One landed in Sholes' hands. Chet had relocated to Denver after being fired by KWTO in Missouri for "not sounding country enough." He was to be brought into RCA as a guitarist, singer and songwriter. Arrangements were made for Atkins to travel to Chicago to do a demo recording. He cut eight "sides" (songs) in Chicago with his idol George Barnes on rhythm guitar, Augie Klein on accordion, Charles Hurta on fiddle, and Harold Siegel on bass. Five of those eight songs recorded April 11, 1947 included Chet singing. RCA released the songs on a 10" vinyl as Chet Atkins and his Colorado Mountain Boys.

Chet later spent time trying to locate those early demos of himself singing in order to destroy them.

Atkins later traveled to New York to record as a sideman and, because of an impending musician's strike, to also stockpile solo recordings for release in case the strike was a protracted one. After these initial recordings, he was still unemployed. He returned to Knoxville and continued on radio there until he joined The Carter Sisters and Mother Maybelle Carter.

The song "Gallopin' on the Guitar" had been released as a single in 1947 and was a minor hit, often being used as a radio theme song by 1949.

Also in 1953, his single "Country Gentleman", co-written with Boudleaux Bryant, was a minor hit. It was recorded in a garage.

Atkins stayed with RCA for 36 years until he moved to Columbia Records in 1983.

Track listing
 "Third Man Theme" (Anton Karas) – 2:26
 "St. Louis Blues" (W. C. Handy) – 2:17
 "Lover, Come Back to Me" (Oscar Hammerstein, Sigmund Romberg) – 2:26
 "Nobody's Sweetheart" (Ernie Erdman, Gus Kahn, Billy Meyers, E. Schoebel) – 2:16
 "Stephen Foster Medley" (Stephen Foster) – 2:26
 "Hangover Blues/Imagination" (Atkins, Bryant) (Atkins)
 "Black Mountain Rag" (Traditional) – 2:18
 "Galloping on the Guitar" (Atkins) – 2:29

Personnel
Chet Atkins – guitar
Henry "Homer" Haynes – guitar
Ken "Jethro" Burns – mandolin
Charlie Grean – bass

References

External links
 Black Mountain Rag Video

1953 debut albums
Chet Atkins albums
Albums produced by Steve Sholes
RCA Victor albums